Gobitrichinotus arnoulti is a species of sand darter endemic to Madagascar where it occurs in fresh waters.  This species can reach a length of  TL.

References

Gobitrichinotus
Freshwater fish of Madagascar
Taxonomy articles created by Polbot
Fish described in 1963